Craig Midgley (born 24 June 1976) is an English football manager and former player who played as a striker.

Playing career

Bradford City
Midgley was a trainee at his hometown club Bradford City. He made his first-team debut as a substitute on 17 April 1995 against Rotherham United. He failed to break into the team and during his three seasons in the first team squad he was limited to 11 league appearances from the bench. He scored one goal in a 1–1 draw with Hull City on 18 November 1995. Instead he had two loan spells at Scarborough and one at Darlington.

Hartlepool United
Midgley left Bradford to join Hartlepool United in March 1998. He spent more than three seasons at Victoria Park during which time he played 86 league games, 35 of which were as substitute, scoring 18 times. In June 2001 he moved back to West Yorkshire to join Halifax Town.

Halifax Town
In five seasons at Halifax, Midgley was a regular first-team player. He started 119 games, was substitute 42 times and scored 32 goals.

Farsley Celtic
He left to join Farsley Celtic and link up with former Bradford teammate Lee Sinnott. But he missed out on Farsley's Conference North play-off final in May 2007 after agreeing to join Australian side Manly United. Midgley hoped the move would launch a managerial or coaching career after taking the necessary qualifications.

Manly United

Midgley moved to Australia and signed for New South Wales Premier League side Manly United. He played for 3 years at the club, his final year being as a player/coach role. When Phil Moss moved to the A-League club Central Coast Mariners to be assistant coach to former Socceroos manager Graham Arnold, Midgley was appointed temporary head manager for the club.

References

External links

1976 births
Living people
English footballers
English expatriate footballers
Bradford City A.F.C. players
Scarborough F.C. players
Darlington F.C. players
Hartlepool United F.C. players
Halifax Town A.F.C. players
Farsley Celtic A.F.C. players
English Football League players
Footballers from Bradford
Manly United FC players
Central Coast Mariners FC non-playing staff
Association football forwards